Earl M. Willits (October 30, 1946 – July 11, 1990) was an American politician who served in the Iowa House of Representatives from the 57th district from 1971 to 1973 and in the Iowa Senate from the 31st district from 1973 to 1979.

Willits graduated from Union-Whitten High School, earned an undergraduate degree from Iowa State University in 1968 and was honored with the Cardinal's Key for academic excellence. He received a Juris Doctor degree from Drake University Law School in 1974.

In 1979, he resigned from the Senate to work in the Attorney General Office. He eventually functioned as First Assistant Attorney General.

Earl married Martha Oldson of Eagle Grove in 1969 and they were the parents of two daughters, Anne and Emily of Des Moines. They were divorced in 1986. He died of AIDS on July 11, 1990, in Des Moines, Iowa at age 43.

References

1946 births
1990 deaths
Democratic Party members of the Iowa House of Representatives
Democratic Party Iowa state senators
20th-century American politicians
AIDS-related deaths Iowa
Drake University Law School alumni